The Bloody Money (Turkish: Kanlı Para) is a 1953 Turkish adventure film directed by Orhon M. Ariburnu and starring Ayhan Isik and Nedret Güvenç.

Cast
 Ayhan Isik 
 Nedret Güvenç 
 Orhon M. Ariburnu 
 Aliye Rona 
 Lale Oraloglu
 Refik Kemal Arduman 
 Tevhid Bilge 
 Adil Güldürür 
 Hüseyin Kemal Gürmen 
 Muharrem Gürses 
 Atif Kaptan 
 Sadri Karan 
 Mücap Ofluoglu 
 Necmi Oy 
 Salih Tozan 
 Kadri Ögelman

References

Bibliography
 Giovanni Scognamillo & Metin Demirhan. Fantastik Türk sineması. Kabalcı Yayınevi, 1999.

External links
 

1953 films
1953 adventure films
1950s Turkish-language films
Turkish adventure films
Turkish black-and-white films